Muthu Nilavan (முத்துநிலவன்) also known as Muthu Baskaran, from Pudukottai, is a Tamil scholar and poet of Tamil Nadu. He has worked as a teacher for more than three decades.

Life
He is an orator, and as mediator, he has participated in many talk shows and debates among Tamil scholars, students, and the public.

Books
 New Traditions, அன்னம் பதிப்பகம், 2ஆம் பதிப்பு, 2014 
 Literatures of 20th century: A critical review, 1995  
 Yesterday English and Today Tamil: Compilation of articles, 2003 
 Let us write and speak in proper Tamil without mistakes, 2008 
 Kamban Tamil and Computer Tamil, 2014
 My beloved daughter, you need not get the first rank, அகரம், தஞ்சாவூர், 2015

References

External links
 N.Muthu Nilavan Blog 
 Who have more love and affection, 14 January 2014
 Whether the films have changed the society or cheated it, 29 August 2014
 Education or Industrial development is helpful for the improvement of the society, 1 January 2015
 Deciding factor of life: Tradition or Modern, 14 April 2015

Living people
Tamil scholars
Year of birth missing (living people)